The Joiners is a small music venue in a former pub (The Joiners Arms) on St Mary Street, St Mary's, Southampton, England. It has played host to many up-and-coming bands. The pub started having live acts in the back room in 1968. The maximum capacity is 200 people.

In 2013, the venue was named Britain's best small music venue in a competition run by NME.

In December 2006, writer Oliver Gray published a book entitled Access One Step: The Official History of the Joiners Arms, which documents the history of the venue and includes a foreword by Razorlight drummer Andy Burrows.

Notable bands that played at The Joiners

References

External links

Pubs in Southampton
Music venues in Hampshire
1968 establishments in England
Music venues completed in 1968
Former pubs in England
Former music venues in England